Duman (English: Smoke) is a Turkish rock band. Founded in 1999, the band features Kaan Tangöze on vocals and guitar, Ari Barokas on bass guitar and backing vocals, Batuhan Mutlugil on lead guitar and backing vocals and Cengiz Baysal on drums.  Cengiz Baysal left the group in November 2016, and the new drummer is Mehmet Demirdelen.  The band's music combines elements of traditional Turkish folk music with modern rock and grunge.

They composed a song titled "Eyvallah" following May 2013 Taksim Gezi Park protests which they published on YouTube. Duman - Eyvallah

Discography

Albums

Studio albums 
Eski Köprünün Altında (1999) 
Belki Alışman Lazım (2002) 
Seni Kendime Sakladım (2005) 
Duman I & II (2009)
Darmaduman (2013)

Compilation albums 
En Güzel Günüm Gecem 1999-2006 (2007)

Live albums 
Konser (2003) 
Bu Akşam Konser DVD (2004)
Rock'N Coke Konseri (2008)
Canlı (2011)

Music videos 
 Köprüaltı (1999) - Eski Köprünün Altında
 Hayatı Yaşa (1999) - Eski Köprünün Altında
 Bebek (2000) - Eski Köprünün Altında
 Her Şeyi Yak (2002) - Belki Alışman Lazım
 Oje (2002) - Belki Alışman Lazım
 Bu Akşam (2003) - Belki Alışman Lazım
 Çile Bülbülüm [Konser] (2003) - Konser
 Olmadı Yar [Konser] (2003) - Konser
 Belki Alışman Lazım (2003) - Belki Alışman Lazım
 Seni Kendime Sakladım (2005) - Seni Kendime Sakladım
 Aman Aman (2006) - Seni Kendime Sakladım
 Karanlıkta (2006) - Yakup & Kaan & Batuhan - Karanlıkta
 En Güzel Günüm Gecem (2006) - Seni Kendime Sakladım
 Dibine Kadar (2009) - Duman I
 Senden Daha Güzel (2009) - Duman II
 Elleri Ellerime (2010) - Duman II
 Sor Bana Pişman Mıyım (2011) - Duman I
 Helal Olsun (2011) - Canlı
 İyi De Bana Ne (Akustik) (2012) - Canlı
 Yürek (2013) - Darmaduman
 Melankoli (2014) - Darmaduman
 Öyle Dertli (2015) - Darmaduman

Duet albums 
 İstanbul Hatırası: Köprüyü Geçmek (2005) - Doublemoon
 Yakup & Kaan & Batuhan - Karanlıkta (2006) - EMI
 Sınav Soundtrack (2006) - Sony BMG
 Bulutsuzluk Özlemi 20 Yaşında (2007) - DMC
 İstanbul Sensin (2010) - Sony BMG
 Orhan Gencebay ile Bir Ömür (2012) - Poll Production

References

External links
 Official Website (Turkish)

Musical groups established in 1999
Turkish grunge groups
Turkish alternative rock groups
Musical groups from Istanbul
1999 establishments in Turkey